Pink Zone is a 2014 science fiction-drama film written and directed by Benjamin J. Walter.

Plot 

It is the year 2026, women are almost on the edge of disappearance due to a fatal kissing virus carried and transmitted by men, reducing the female population to a bare minimum. Under these circumstances, the US government initiates a project called the PINK ZONE to protect and safeguard the remaining females. Emily (Jayna Sweet) is one among them who stays with her father, a legend who created the project. When a group of juvenile delinquents carrying the deadly virus attack the school, reckless Emily has to unite with her rash classmates to fight and save themselves from getting infected.

Cast 
 Jayna Sweet as Emily
 Matt Cooper as Dad
 Julian Brand as Brad
 Stell Baharami as Sam
 David Jurbala Jr. as Nick
 Tiago Felizardo as Vince
 Violet Paley as Nicole
 Tara Leahy as Joan
 Cynthia Pinot as Janet
 Duncan Barrett Brown as Erik

Awards 
 IndieFest Film Award 2014 - Award of Merit for Benjamin Walter

Release 
Pink Zone premiered on May 31, 2014, at the Dances With Films film festival at the Chinese Theater in Hollywood. It was released on video on demand and DVD on July 19, 2016.

References

External links

References

2014 films
2014 horror films
American science fiction films
American high school films
American independent films
2010s English-language films
2010s American films